Joseph Larweh Attamah (born 22 May 1994) is a Ghanaian professional footballer who plays as a defender for Turkish club Kayserispor on loan from İstanbul Başakşehir.

Career
Born in Ghana, Attamah started his career with local side Tema Youth where he played at least 15 Ghana Premier League matches without goal.  In August 2014 he moved abroad for the first time joining Turkish First Division side Adana Demirspor.  Attamah currently plays for the Ghana national team. He played in the Turkey 2013 FIFA U-20 World Cup, scoring one goal.
During the Under 20 world cup in Turkey, he was scouted by some agents who represent Adana Demirspor. They then signed him in 2014.

In 2016, he was transferred to İstanbul Başakşehir a Turkish club. On 25 January 2020 he was transferred to Fatih Karagümrük'te after he terminated his contract with İstanbul Başakşehir.

Career statistics

International

References

External links

LIBERTY PROFESSIONALS FC 1-0 TEMA YOUTH FC at westafricanfootball.com
TEMA YOUTH FC – SEASON PREVIEW at westafricanfootball.com

1994 births
Living people
Ghanaian footballers
Ghana under-20 international footballers
Ghana international footballers
Süper Lig players
TFF First League players
Adana Demirspor footballers
İstanbul Başakşehir F.K. players
Fatih Karagümrük S.K. footballers
Kayserispor footballers
Ghanaian expatriate footballers
Expatriate footballers in Turkey
Ghanaian expatriate sportspeople in Turkey
Association football defenders
Footballers from Accra
2019 Africa Cup of Nations players